Etta Jane Bertschinger  (née Murfitt) is a British dancer, choreographer and the associate director of the New Adventures educational strand. She has worked for Matthew Bourne for over 20 years in a variety of different roles. She teaches throughout the UK and abroad for dance companies and dance institutions, as well as being a freelance faculty member of the London Contemporary Dance School and Young Place.

Career
Murfitt trained at the London Contemporary Dance School. Murfitt is a founding member of Images Dance Company, and has also danced with the Scottish Dance Theatre, Arc Dance Company and Aletta Collins Dance Company. She teaches widely, teaching as the Rehearsal Director for Shobana Jeyasingh Dance Company. Etta Murfitt is a freelance faculty member of London Contemporary Dance School and the Young Place, both in London. Apart from her extensive work with Matthew Bourne, Murfitt has also appeared on TV in shows such as Mrs Hartley & The Growth Centre and Aletta Collins' Storm (both produced by BBC TV) and choreographed Le Nozze di Figaro (Holland Park Opera), The Way of the World (Wilton's Music Hall) and A Midsummer Night's Dream (Albery Theatre, London).

Murfitt has danced with Matthew Bourne's companies AMP and New Adventures for over 20 years. She has created many roles in Bourne's work, including Clara In "Nutcracker", Rita in "The Car Man" and Peg Boggs in "Edward Scissorhands". She currently also serves as Artistic Associate and Associate Director for all the companies' productions. She has worked with New Adventures since its foundation.

Murfitt was appointed Member of the Order of the British Empire (MBE) in the 2022 Birthday Honours for services to dance.

Acting

Murfitt has played and created many roles in Bourne's work including the original productions of the following:

Credits

Choreography

Her choreography credits include
 Le nozze di Figaro directed by Martin Lloyd-Evans for Holland Park Opera
 The Way of the World directed by Selina Cadell at Wilton's Music Hall
 Restaging AMP's Nutcracker! (Sadler's Wells)
 Restaging AMP's The Infernal Galop for Images of Dance (2007) and Sarasota Ballet, Florida (2008)
 A Midsummer Night's Dream with Dawn French, directed by Matthew Francis at the Albery Theatre

 Restaging New Adventures Dorian Gray in Japan July 2013
 Kneehigh Theatre. choreographer The Wild Bride (2013) 
 Kneehigh Theatre. choreographer Dead Dog in a Suitcase Everyman theatre Liverpool (2014)
 New Adventures. Associate Artistic Director  & Choreographer Sleeping Beauty
 Shakespeare's Globe A Midsummer Nights Dream (2016)
 New Adventures. Associate Artistic Director  & Choreographer The Red Shoes (2016)

Film Credits

 Film credits include: 
 Clara in Nutcracker! (BBC/NVC)
 Rita in The Car Man (Channel 4)
 Rehearsal Director Swan Lake (BBC)
 Late Flowering Lust (BBC)
 Roald Dahl's Red Riding Hood (BBC)#
 Mrs Hartley and the Growth Centre (BBC)
 Storm (Aletta Collins/BBC Dance for the Camera)

Stage Credits
Her stage credits include: 
For NA and AMP: Associate Director and creation of the role of Peg Boggs in Edward Scissorhands (London, UK tour, Japan, Korea, USA, Australia, Athens, Antwerp), Associate Director for restaging of Highland Fling (Sadler's Wells, UK tour and Japanese tour)
Associate Director and recreation of the role of Clara in Nutcracker! (London, UK tours, Far East tour and US tour), Associate Director and creation of the role of Rita in The Car Man (Old Vic, UK tour, European tour, US tour and Japanese tour), Rehearsal Director for the original production of Swan Lake at Sadler's Wells and UK tour, roles including French & Spanish Princesses and The Queen in Swan Lake (West End, Los Angeles, Broadway), Rehearsal Director and creation of the role of Judy in Cinderella (West End and Los Angeles), creation of the role of Madge in Highland Fling, The Infernal Galop, The Percys of Fitzrovia, Deadly Serious and Town & Country; Clara in the original production of Nutcracker! (Opera North and Sadler Wells) and Matron/Queen Candy in 2007/08 production; founder member & dancer with Images Dance Theatre Scottish Dance Theatre; Arc Dance Company; and created the role of Netta in This is the Picture with Aletta Collins Dance Company for Dance Umbrella.

References

External links
 Etta Murfitt on Swan Lake Tour
 Etta Murfitt on Twitter
 Articles that include Etta Murfitt by LaTimes
 Etta Murfitt on Highland Fling

British ballerinas
Living people
English choreographers
English television actresses
1960 births
Members of the Order of the British Empire